Keep Away from the Window is a 2000 Polish drama film directed by Jan Jakub Kolski about a young couple who conceal a Jewish woman in their house during World War II. It was entered into the 23rd Moscow International Film Festival.

Cast
 Dorota Landowska as Barbara
 Dominika Ostałowska as Regina Lilienstern
 Bartosz Opania as Jan
 Krzysztof Pieczynski as Jodla
 Karolina Gruszka as Adult Helusia
 Dariusz Toczek as Marek
 Adam Kamien as Dolke
 Magdalena Mirek as Jodla's wife
 Olgierd Łukaszewicz as Regina's messenger #1
 Grzegorz Damięcki as Regina's messenger #2

References

External links
 

2000 films
2000 drama films
Polish drama films
2000s Polish-language films
Films directed by Jan Jakub Kolski